Nationality words link to articles with information on the nation's poetry or literature (for instance, Irish or France).

Events

Works published 

 Pietro Aretino, Sonetti Lussuriosi ("Sonnets of lust" or "Aretino's Postures"), to accompany an edition of Raimondi's erotic engravings, I Modi, Italy
 John Skelton, publication year uncertain; also contains "Upon a Dead Man's Head" and "Womanhood, Wanton ye want", England
 Gian Travers, Chianzun dalla guerra dagl Chiaste da Müs, Putèr variety of Romansh language, Switzerland
 Marco Girolamo Vida, also known as "Hieronymus Vida", Italy:
 De arte poetica ("The Art of Poetry"), tract on poetic theory partly inspired by Horace
 Scacchia, Ludus ("The Game of Chess"), about the creation of chess as a way for the mythological Greek god Mercury to win over Caissa; involves a chess game between Apollo and Mercury in the presence of the other gods; a 658-line poem in Virgilian hexameters, translated into many languages over the centuries (an unauthorized, 742-line version appears in 1525 with some different names; in 1763 the English author and poet Sir William Jones publishes another chess poem involving the characters of Mercury and Caissa)

Births
Death years link to the corresponding "[year] in poetry" article:
 Luis de Leon (died 1591), Spanish mystic and poet
 Łukasz Górnicki, (died 1603), Polish humanist, writer, poet, secretary and chancellor of Sigismund August of Poland

Deaths
Birth years link to the corresponding "[year] in poetry" article:
 Andrea Fulvio (born 1470), Italian Renaissance humanist, poet and antiquarian
 Niccolò Machiavelli (born 1469), Italian philosopher, writer, poet, musician, and politician
 Šiško Menčetić (born 1457), Croatian poet and Ragusan nobleman
 Panfilo Sasso (born 1450), Italian, Latin-language poet

See also

 Poetry
 16th century in poetry
 16th century in literature
 French Renaissance literature
 Renaissance literature
 Spanish Renaissance literature

Notes

16th-century poetry
Poetry